The State Register of Heritage Places is maintained by the Heritage Council of Western Australia. , 122 places are heritage-listed in the Shire of Katanning, of which 19 are on the State Register of Heritage Places.

List

State Register of Heritage Places
The Western Australian State Register of Heritage Places, lists the following 19 state registered places within the Shire of Katanning:

Shire of Katanning heritage-listed places
The following places are heritage listed in the Shire of Katanning but are not State registered:

References

Katanning
Katanning
Katanning, Western Australia